A residential treatment center (RTC), sometimes called a rehab, is a live-in health care facility providing therapy for substance use disorders, mental illness, or other behavioral problems. Residential treatment may be considered the "last-ditch" approach to treating abnormal psychology or psychopathology.

A residential treatment program encompasses any residential program which treats a behavioural issue, including milder psychopathology such as eating disorders (e.g. weight loss camp) or indiscipline (e.g. fitness boot camps as lifestyle interventions). Sometimes residential facilities provide enhanced access to treatment resources, without those seeking treatment considered residents of a treatment program, such as the sanatoriums of Eastern Europe. Controversial uses of residential programs for behavioural and cultural modification include conversion therapy and mandatory American and Canadian residential schools for indigenous populations. A common feature of residential programs is controlled social access to people outside the program, and limited access for outside parties to witness daily conditions within the program. Within psychiatry it is understood that it can be almost impossible to change entrenched behaviour without impacting habitual relationships, at least in the short term, but the relatively closed nature of many residential programs also makes it possible to conceal abusive practice.

Upon discharge, the patient may be enrolled in an intensive outpatient program for follow up outside the residential setting.

Historical background in the United States 

In the 1600s, Great Britain established the Poor Law that allowed poor children to become trained in apprenticeships by removing them from their families and forcing them to live in group homes.   In the 1800s, the United States copied this system, but often mentally ill children were placed in jail with adults because society did not know what to do with them. There were no RTCs in place to provide the 24-hour care they needed and they were placed in jail when they could not live in the home. In the 1900s, Anna Freud and her peers were part of the Vienna Psychoanalytic Society and they worked on how to care for children. They worked to create residential treatment centers for children and adolescents with emotional and behavioral disorders.

The year 1944 marked the beginning of Bruno Bettelheim's work at the Orthogenic School in Chicago, and Fritz Redl and David Wineman's work at the Pioneer House in Detroit. Bettelheim helped increase awareness of staff attitudes on children in treatment. He reinforced the idea that a psychiatric hospital was a community, where staff and patients influenced each other and patients were shaped by each other's behaviors. Bettelheim also believed that families should not have frequent contact with their child while he or she was in treatment. This differs from community-based therapy and family therapy of recent years, in which the goal of treatment is for a child to remain in the home.  Also, emphasis is placed on the family's role in improving long term outcomes after treatment in a RTC. The Pioneer House created a special-education program to help improve impulse control and sociability in children. After WWII, Bettelheim and the joint efforts of Redl and Wineman were instrumental in establishing residential facilities as therapeutic-treatment alternative for children and adolescents who can not live at home

In the 1960s, the second generation of psychoanalytical RTC was created. These programs continued the work of the Vienna Psychoanalytic Society in order to include families and communities in the child's treatment. One example of this is the Walker Home and School which was established by Dr. Albert Treischman in 1961 for adolescent boys with severe emotional or behavioral disorders. He involved families in order to help them develop relationships with their children within homes, public schools and communities. Family and community involvement made this program different from previous programs.

Beginning in the 1980s, cognitive behavioral therapy was more commonly used in child psychiatry, as a source of intervention for troubled youth, and was applied in RTCs to produce better long-term results. Attachment theory also developed in response to the rise of children admitted to RTCs who were abused or neglected. These children needed specialized care by caretakers who were knowledgeable about trauma.

In the 1990s, the number of children entering RTCs increased dramatically, leading to a policy shift from institution- based services to a family-centered community system of care. This also reflected the lack of appropriate treatment resources. However, residential treatment centers have continued to grow and today house over 50,000 children. The number of residential treatment centers in the United States is currently estimated at 28,900 facilities.

Children and teens 
RTCs for adolescents, sometimes referred to as teen rehab centers, provide treatment for issues and disorders such as oppositional defiant disorder, conduct disorder, depression, bipolar disorder, attention deficit hyperactivity disorder (ADHD), educational issues, some personality disorders, and phase-of-life issues, as well as substance use disorders. Most use a behavior modification paradigm. Others are relationally oriented. Some utilize a community or positive peer-culture model. Generalist programs are usually large (80-plus clients and as many as 250) and level-focused in their treatment approach. That is, in order to manage clients' behavior, they frequently put systems of rewards and punishments in place. Specialist programs are usually smaller (less than 100 clients and as few as 10 or 12). Specialist programs typically are not as focused on behavior modification as generalist programs are.

Different RTCs work with different types of problems, and the structure and methods of RTCs vary. Some RTCs are lock-down facilities; that is, the residents are locked inside the premises. In a locked residential treatment facility, clients' movements are restricted. By comparison, an unlocked residential treatment facility allows them to move about the facility with relative freedom, but they are only allowed to leave the facility under specific conditions. Residential treatment centers should not be confused with residential education programs, which offer an alternative environment for at-risk children to live and learn together outside their homes.

Residential treatment centers for children and adolescents treat multiple conditions from drug and alcohol addictions to emotional and physical disorders as well as mental illnesses. Various studies of youth in residential treatment centers have found that many have a history of family-related issues, often including physical or sexual abuse. Some facilities address specialized disorders, such as reactive attachment disorder (RAD).

Residential treatment centers generally are clinically focused and primarily provide behavior management and treatment for adolescents with serious issues. In contrast, therapeutic boarding schools provide therapy and academics in a residential boarding school setting, employing staff of social workers, psychologists, and psychiatrists to work with the students on a daily basis. This form of treatment has a goal of academic achievement as well as physical and mental stability in children, adolescents, and young adults. Recent trends have ensured that residential treatment facilities have more input from behavioral psychologists to improve outcomes and lessen unethical practices.

Behavioral interventions

Behavioral interventions have been very helpful in reducing problem behaviors in residential treatment centers. The type of clients receiving services in a facility (children with emotional or behavioral disorders versus intellectual disability versus psychiatric disorders) is a factor in the effectiveness of behavior modification. Behavioral intervention has been found to be successful even when medication interventions fail. However, there is evidence that certain populations may benefit more from interventions that fall outside of the behavior-modification paradigm. For instance, positive outcomes have been reported for neurosequential interventions targeting issues of early childhood trauma and attachment. (Perry, 2006). Although the majority of children who receive services in RTCs present emotional and behavioral disorders (EBDs), such as attention deficit hyperactivity disorder (ADHD), Oppositional Defiant Disorder (ODD), and Conduct Disorder (CD), behavior-modification techniques can be an effective way of decreasing the maladaptive behavior of these clients. Interventions such as response cost, token economies, social skills training groups, and the use of positive social reinforcement can be used to increase prosocial behavior in children (Ormrod, 2009).

Behavioral interventions are successful in treating children with behavioral disorders in part because they incorporate two principles that make up the core of how children learn: conceptual understanding and building on their pre-existing knowledge. Research by Resnick (1989) shows that even infants are able to develop basic quantitative frameworks. New information is incorporated into the framework and serves as the basis for the problem-solving skills a child develops as she or he is exposed to different types of stimuli (e.g., new situations, people, or environments). The experiences and environment that a child is exposed to can have either a positive or negative outcome, which, in turn, impacts how he or she remembers, reasons, and adapts when encountering aversive stimuli. Furthermore, when children have acquired extensive knowledge, it affects what they notice and how they organize, represent, and interpret information in their current environment (Bransford, Brown, & Cocking, 2000). Many of the children housed in RTCs have been exposed to negative environmental factors that have contributed to the behavior problems that they are exhibiting.

Many interventions build on children's prior knowledge of how reward works. Reinforcing children for pro-social behaviors (i.e., using token economies, in which children earn tokens for appropriate behaviors; response cost (losing previously earned tokens following inappropriate behavior; and implementing social-skills training groups, where participants observe and participate in modeling appropriate social behaviors help them develop a deeper understanding of the positive results of pro=social behavior.

Wolfe, Dattilo, & Gast (2003) found that using a token economy in concert with cooperative games increased pro-social behaviors (e.g. statements of encouragement, praise, or appreciation, shaking hands, and giving high fives) while decreasing anti-social ones (swearing, threatening peers with physical harm, name-calling, and physical aggression). The use of a response-cost system has been efficacious in reducing problem behaviors. A single-subject withdrawal design employing non-contingent reinforcement with response cost was used to reduce maladaptive verbal and physical behaviors exhibited by a post-institutional student with ADHD (Nolan & Filter, 2012). Wilhite & Bullock (2012) implemented a social-skills training group to increase the social competence of students with EBDs. Results showed significant differences between pre- and post-intervention disciplinary referrals, as well as several other elements of behavioral-ratings scales. Evidence also exists for the usefulness of social reinforcement as a part of behavioral interventions for children with ADHD. A study by Kohls, Herpertz-Dahlmann, & Kerstin (2009) found that both social and monetary rewards increased inhibition control in both the control and experimental groups. However, results showed that children with ADHD benefitted more from social reinforcement than typical children, indicating that social reinforcement can significantly improve cognitive control in ADHD children. The techniques listed are only a few of the many types of behavioral interventions that can be used to treat children with EBDs. Additional information regarding types of behavioral interventions can be found in the 2003 book Behavioral, Social, and Emotional Assessment of Children and Adolescents by Kenneth Merrell.

Types of Family Therapy used in Residential Treatment Center

Narrative Therapy: Narrative therapy has shown an increase in popularity in the field of family therapy. Narrative therapy developed out from the postmodern viewpoint, which is expressed in its principles: (a) not one universal reality exists, but socially constructed reality; (b) reality is created by language; (c) narrative maintains reality (d) not all narratives are equivalent (Freedman and Combs, 1996).

Narrative family therapy views human issues from those roots as emerging and being sustained by dominant stories that control the life of an individual. Problems arise when individual stories do not match with their experience of living. According to the narrative viewpoint, by offering a new and distinct perspective

In a problem-saturated narrative, therapy is a process of rewriting personal narratives. The process of rewriting the narrative of the client involves (a) expressing the problem(s) they are experiencing; (b) breaking down narratives that trigger problems through questioning; (c) recognizing special outcomes or occasions where a person has not been constrained by their situation; (d) connecting specific results to the future and providing an alternate and desired narrative; (e) inviting supports among the community to spectate the new narrative and (f) logging new document  Since postmodern viewpoints prioritize concepts rather than techniques, in narrative therapy, formal methods are restricted. However, some researchers have described techniques that are useful in helping an individual rewrite a specific experience, like retelling stories and writing letters.

Children admitted to a residential treatment center have behavior problems so extreme that residential treatment is their last hope. Parents seem to think the child is the problem needed to be fixed, and everything will be okay; on the other hand, the child generally sees themselves as a victim. Narrative therapy enables these perspectives to be broken down and troubling behaviors of the child to be externalized, which could encourage both the child and the family members to achieve a new perspective no one feels prosecuted or blamed.

Multi Systemic Therapy:

The model has shown success in sustaining long-standing improvements in children's and adolescents' antisocial behaviors. Families in MST have demonstrated improved family stability and post-treatment adaptability and growing support, and reduced conflict- hostility

The method's ultimate objectives include a) eliminating behavior problems, b) enhancing family functioning, c) strengthening the adolescents' ability to perform better at school and other community settings, and d) decreasing out of home placement

Controversy
Disability rights organizations, such as the Bazelon Center for Mental Health Law, oppose placement in RTC programs, calling into question the appropriateness and efficacy of such placements, noting the failure of such programs to address problems in the child's home and community environment, and calling attention to the limited mental-health services offered and substandard educational programs.  Concerns specifically related to a specific type of residential treatment center called therapeutic boarding schools include:

inappropriate discipline techniques,
medical neglect,
restricted communication such as lack access to child protection and advocacy hotlines, and
lack of monitoring and regulation.

Bazelon promotes community-based services on the basis that they are more effective and less costly than residential placement.

A 2007 Report to Congress by the Government Accountability Office (GAO) found cases involving serious abuse and neglect at some of these programs.

From late 2007 through 2008, a broad coalition of grass-roots efforts, as well as prominent medical and psychological organizations such as the Alliance for the Safe, Therapeutic and Appropriate use of Residential Treatment (ASTART) and the Community Alliance for the Ethical Treatment of Youth (CAFETY), provided testimony and support that led to the creation of the Stop Child Abuse in Residential Programs for Teens Act of 2008 by the United States Congress Committee on Education and Labor.

Jon Martin-Crawford and Kathryn Whitehead of CAFETY testified at a hearing of the United States Congressional Committee on Education and Labor on April 24, 2008, and described abusive practices they had experienced at the Family Foundation School and Mission Mountain School, both therapeutic boarding schools.

Due to the absence of regulation of these programs by the federal government and because many are not subject to state licensing or monitoring, the Federal Trade Commission has issued a guide for parents considering such placement.

Residential treatment programs are often caught in the cross-fire during custody battles, as parents who are denied custody try to discredit the opposing spouse and the treatment program.

Research on effectiveness 
Studies of different treatment approaches have found that residential treatment is effective for individuals with a long history of addictive behavior or criminal activity. RTCs offer a variety of structured programs designed to address the specific need of the inmates. Despite the controversy surrounding the efficacy of (RTCs), recent research has revealed that community-based residential treatment programs have positive long-term effects for children and youth with behavioral problems.

Participants in a pilot program employing family-driven care and positive peer modeling displayed no incidence of elopement, self-injurious behaviors, or physical aggression, and just one case of property destruction when compared to a control group (Holstead, 2010). The success of treatment for children in RTCs depends heavily on their background i.e., their state, situation, circumstances and behavioral status before commencement of treatment. Children who displayed lower rates of internalizing and externalizing behavior problems at intake and had a lower level of exposure to negative environmental factors (e.g., domestic violence, parental substance use, high crime rates), showed better results than children whose symptoms were more severe (den Dunnen, 2012).

Additional research demonstrates that planned treatment, or knowing the expected duration of treatment, is strongly correlated with positive treatment outcomes. Long-term results for children using planned treatment showed that they are 21% less likely to engage in criminal behavior and 40% less likely to need hospitalization for mental-health problems (Lindqvist, 2010). Further evidence exists supporting the long-term effectiveness of RTCs for children exhibiting severe mental health issues. Preyde (2011) found that clients showed a statistically significant reduction in symptom severity 12–18 months after leaving an RTC, results which were maintained 36–40 months after their discharge from the facility.

However, although there is a great deal of research supporting the validity of RTCs as a way of treating children and youth with behavioral disorders, little is known about the outcomes-monitoring practices of such facilities. Those that track clients after they leave the RTC only do so for an average of six months. In order to continue to provide effective long-term treatment to at-risk populations, further efforts are needed to encourage the monitoring of outcomes after discharge from residential treatment (J.D. Brown, 2011).

One problem that hinders the effectiveness of RTCs is elopement or "running". A study by Kashubeck found that runaways from RTCs were "more likely to have a history of elopement, a suspected history of sexual abuse, an affective-disorder diagnosis, and parents whose rights had been terminated." By employing these characteristics of patients in the design of treatment, RTCs may be more successful in reducing elopement and otherwise improving the probability of clients' success.

See also

 Anti-psychiatry
 Behavior modification facility
 Child abandonment
 Child abuse
 Child and family services
 Child and Youth Care
 Community-based care
 Congregate care
 Cottage Homes
 Family support
 Foster care in the United States
 Foster care
 Group home
 Kinship care
 Orphanage
 Residential care
 Residential child care community
 Teaching-family model
 Therapeutic boarding school
 Total institution
 Troubled teen industry
 Wraparound (childcare)

References

Further reading

External links 
 
 Residential Treatment Programs — Concerns Regarding Abuse and Death in Certain Programs for Troubled Youth - United States Government Accountability Office
 Residential Facilities — State and Federal Oversight Gaps May Increase Risk to Youth Well-Being - United States Government Accountability Office
 Residential Programs — Selected Cases of Death, Abuse, and Deceptive Marketing  - United States Government Accountability Office

Behavior modification
Psychotherapy
Substance-related disorders
Residential treatment centers